The  Wolfenstein is an isolated rock formation, located between Tirschenreuth and Hohenwald in Bavaria.

Due to erosion, the granite blocks appear to look like a pile of bags.

See also 
Tor (geography)

External links 
 Vereinigung der Freunde der Mineralogie und Geologie Weiden - 
 Bayerisches Geologisches Landesamt 
 Stadt Tirschenreuth

Rock formations of Bavaria
Granite domes